Ciss (pronounced SIHS) is a Senegalese surname. Notable people with the surname include:

Amadou Ciss (born 1999), Senegalese footballer who plays for Fortuna Sittard
Elhadji Ciss (born 1994), Senegalese footballer who plays for Sion
Khadija Ciss (born 1983), Senegalese swimmer
Saliou Ciss (born 1989), Senegalese football player who plays for Valenciennes